Acrocercops erioplaca is a moth of the family Gracillariidae, known from Bihar, India. It was described by Edward Meyrick in 1918. The hostplant for the species is Terminalia catappa.

References

erioplaca
Moths of Asia
Moths described in 1918